Basil Myron Schott  (September 21, 1939 – June 10, 2010) was the Archbishop of the Byzantine Catholic Archeparchy of Pittsburgh from 2002 until his death.

The youngest son of Michael Schott and Mary Schott (née Krusko), Basil Schott was born in Freeland, Pennsylvania, and attended St. Mary Byzantine Catholic School as a child. He graduated from St. Gabriel High School in Hazleton and entered the Byzantine Franciscan novitiate at Holy Dormition Monastery in Sybertsville on August 3, 1958. He was professed as a Franciscan friar on August 4, 1959. He was ordained to the priesthood on August 29, 1965 by Bishop Stephen J. Kocisko at the Franciscan Monastery in New Canaan, Connecticut. Schott earned bachelor's degrees in philosophy and theology from Immaculate Conception College in Troy, New York, master's degrees in theology and pastoral counseling from St. Mary Seminary in Norwalk, Connecticut, and a Doctor of Ministry degree from New York Theological Seminary in 1969.

As a Franciscan, his talks on spiritual renewal made him a popular retreat leader. On February 3, 1996, he was appointed bishop of the Byzantine Catholic Eparchy of Parma, and was ordained on July 11, 1996. On May 3, 2002, he was appointed as the fourth Archbishop of the Archeparchy of Pittsburgh, and installed on July 9 of the same year. As his episcopal motto, he chose "In the name of the Lord." He was appointed by Pope Benedict XVI as a member of the Congregation for the Oriental Churches.

Schott died at Passavant Hospital in the North Hills of Pittsburgh on June 10, 2010, at age 70, following a seven-month battle with lymphoma. His final pastoral initiative was the first national gathering of all Byzantine Catholic priests from throughout the United States, June 8–9, 2010, which Schott was unable to attend due to his hospitalization. A funeral liturgy was said on June 18, 2010, and Schott was buried in Mount St. Macrina Cemetery, Uniontown.

References

Ruthenian Catholic bishops
People from Luzerne County, Pennsylvania
1939 births
2010 deaths
Deaths from cancer in Pennsylvania
Deaths from lymphoma
American Eastern Catholics
American Eastern Catholic bishops
American Friars Minor
Franciscan bishops
20th-century Eastern Catholic bishops
21st-century Eastern Catholic bishops
Catholics from Pennsylvania